Escarlà is a locality located in the municipality of Tremp, in Province of Lleida province, Catalonia, Spain. As of 2020, it has a population of 5.

Geography 
Escarlà is located 106km north of Lleida.

References

Populated places in the Province of Lleida